Ragnar Ekholdt (24 January 1914 – 3 September 1998) was a Norwegian middle-distance runner. He competed in the men's 1500 metres at the 1936 Summer Olympics.

References

1914 births
1998 deaths
Athletes (track and field) at the 1936 Summer Olympics
Norwegian male middle-distance runners
Olympic athletes of Norway
Place of birth missing